Queensway station is located around and under the Queensway along the Southwest Transitway in Ottawa, Canada. The upper platforms provide access to crosstown route 55, while the lower platforms are for Transitway routes such as routes 74 and 75 and eastbound trips of routes 61, 62, 63, and 64.

The station serves nearby residential areas through the bikepath, which is to the west of the transit station.

The station is scheduled to be demolished when construction begins for phase two of the O-Train.

Service

The following routes currently serve Queensway station:

Notes 

 Connexion routes from Barrhaven, Bells Corners, Stittsville, and Kanata as well as Rapid route 63 and Local route 64 allow passengers to get off at this station in the morning upon request, but skip it altogether in the afternoon.
 Route 63 and 64 only allow passengers off on the upper level of the station, however both offer full service to the lower eastbound platform.

References

External links
OC Transpo station page
OC Transpo Area map

Transitway (Ottawa) stations